Kaniuki  (Kaniuky) is a village in the administrative district of Gmina Podedwórze, within Parczew County, Lublin Voivodeship, in eastern Poland.

The village has a population of 23.

References

Kaniuki